The 1989 Maryland Terrapins football team represented University of Maryland, College Park in the 1989 NCAA Division I-A football season. The Terrapins offense scored 215 points while the defense allowed 238 points. Led by head coach Joe Krivak, the team finished the season unranked.

Schedule

Roster

1989 NFL Draft
The following players were selected in the 1989 NFL Draft.

References

Maryland
Maryland Terrapins football seasons
Maryland Terrapins football